Capital Small Finance Bank (erstwhile Capital Local Area Bank) is the India's first small finance bank founded in April 2016 as a microfinance lender, with its headquarters in Jalandhar , India.

History 
Founded in 2000, Capital Local Area Bank was primarily operational in some districts of Punjab including Jalandhar, Kapurthala and Hoshiarpur until 2013. After 2013, the bank expanded its operations in Ludhiana and Amritsar. As of June 2016, the bank was operating through its 76 branches.

After providing in principle approval in September 2016, RBI granted the license to Capital Local Area Bank under Section 22(1) of the Banking Regulation Act, 1949 in 2016 and it started to operate from 24 April 2016 under the new brand name of Capital Small Finance Bank as the first Small finance bank of India. On the foundation day, Capital Small Finance Bank opened 10 new branches to the existing 49 branches of Capital Local Area Bank. As in March 2021, the bank have a total 158 operational branches.

In June 2019, the bank raised 43 Crore fund from Amicus Capital and in November it raised 84 Crore fund as Oman India Joint Investment Fund bought 10% share of the bank.

Stock Exchange Listings 
The equity shares of Capital Small Finance Bank are listed on Bombay Stock Exchange where it is a constituent of the BSE 150 Midcap.

References

See also 

 List of banks in India
 Reserve Bank of India
 Small finance bank

Small finance banks
Banks established in 2000
Indian companies established in 2000
Private sector banks in India
2000 establishments in Punjab, India
Companies listed on the Bombay Stock Exchange